Clyde A. Curtin (October 25, 1920 – August 22, 2011) was a United States Air Force flying ace during the Korean War, shooting down five enemy aircraft in the war.

See also
List of Korean War flying aces

References

Sources

1920 births
2011 deaths
American Korean War flying aces
People from Gresham, Oregon
Recipients of the Distinguished Flying Cross (United States)
Recipients of the Silver Star
United States Army Air Forces pilots of World War II
United States Air Force officers
Military personnel from Oregon